Andrzej Bernard Buncol (born 21 September 1959) is a Polish former footballer who played as a midfielder.

Club career 
He played for clubs such as Ruch Chorzów and Legia Warsaw in Poland. In the (West) German top-flight he made over 180 appearances for FC 08 Homburg, Bayer 04 Leverkusen and Fortuna Düsseldorf.

International career 
He played for the Polish national team. Buncol who won 51 caps was a participant at the 1982 FIFA World Cup (where Poland won third place) and the 1986 FIFA World Cup. After the 1986 World Cup, he emigrated to West Germany.

Honours
Piast Gliwice
Polish Cup runner-up: 1977–78

Bayer 04 Leverkusen
UEFA Cup: 1987–88

Fortuna Düsseldorf
 Oberliga Nordrhein: 1993–94

Poland
Nehru Cup winner: 1984

References

External links
 
 
 

Living people
1959 births
Association football midfielders
Polish footballers
Polish expatriate footballers
Poland youth international footballers
Poland international footballers
Sportspeople from Gliwice
Ruch Chorzów players
Legia Warsaw players
FC 08 Homburg players
Bayer 04 Leverkusen players
Fortuna Düsseldorf players
Ekstraklasa players
Bundesliga players
2. Bundesliga players
Expatriate footballers in West Germany
Expatriate footballers in Germany
1982 FIFA World Cup players
1986 FIFA World Cup players
UEFA Cup winning players
Piast Gliwice players
Polish expatriate sportspeople in West Germany
Polish expatriate sportspeople in Germany